Cass Lake is a  lake located on Vancouver Island on the west side Alberni Inlet,  south of the Nahmint River.

References

Alberni Valley
Lakes of Vancouver Island
Clayoquot Land District